Hazel is a genus of nut-bearing trees and shrubs, including common hazel.

Hazel may also refer to:

Names
Hazel (given name), including a list of people and fictional characters
Hazel (surname), a list of people

Places

United States
Hazel, Kentucky, a city
Hazel, South Dakota, a town
Hazel, Washington, an unincorporated community
Hazel, West Virginia, an unincorporated community

Other uses
Hazel (band), a 1990s American indie rock band
Hazel (comic), a comic strip
Hazel (TV series), a 1960s sitcom based on the comic strip
"Hazel" (song), a song by Bob Dylan
Hurricane Hazel, a 1954 storm
Hazel eyes, an eye color
"Hazel", a song by Spratleys Japs from Pony
Hazel (organ), nickname of the Hazel Wright Organ at Christ Cathedral in Garden Grove, California

See also
Hazel dormouse, a species of rodent that feeds on the nuts of hazels
Hazel grouse, a species of grouse often found in hazel woods
Hazell
Tropical Storm Hazel, a list of tropical storms